Salad Days was a 1958 Australian TV play. It was an adaptation of Salad Days.

It was televised from the Elizabethan Theatre, Sydney, on Channel 2 ABN on 16 April 1958. This was the first time in Australia that an overseas musical was televised direct from the professional stage. The previous year the ABC had broadcast a TV revue. Arthur Wyndham directed the telecast.

It ran for 45 minutes.

The play was touring Australia in 1958.

Cast
Judy Banks

References

External links
Salad Days at National Film and Sound Archive

1950s Australian television plays